Delnaaz Irani is an Indian actress. She is known for her role of Kavita Vinod Verma in Yes Boss and Jaspreet "Sweetu" Kapoor in Kal Ho Naa Ho. Irani also participated in Nach Baliye 1 and Bigg Boss 6.

Career
Delnaaz debuted in Baba Sehgal's music video "Ga Ga Ga Gori Gori" in the early 1990s. In 1999 she played the role of Kavita Vinod Verma in sitcom Yes Boss opposite Aasif Sheikh. She later acted in several comic roles in films like Kal Ho Naa Ho (2003). Irani participated in Nach Baliye, a reality dance show with then husband, Rajeev Paul. She was a contestant in Bigg Boss 6 and got evicted on the 93rd day. She participated in Power Couple with Percy Karkaria as her partner. However, they were eliminated and failed to reach the final.

Filmography

Films

Television

Personal life
Delnaaz met TV actor Rajeev Paul on the sets of television series Parivartan in 1993. The couple later married but got separated in 2010 after 14 years of marriage and got divorced in 2012. The two were participants on the reality TV series Bigg Boss 6.

See also 

 List of Indian film actresses
Delnaz - Disambiguation

References

External links

1973 births
Living people
Indian film actresses
Indian television actresses
Indian soap opera actresses
Indian stage actresses
Irani people
Actresses from Mumbai
21st-century Indian actresses
Actresses in Hindi cinema
Actresses in Hindi television
Bigg Boss (Hindi TV series) contestants